Malapterurus minjiriya is a species of electric catfish native to Burkina Faso, Ethiopia, Ghana, Mali, Nigeria and Togo. This species grows to a length of  SL.

References

Malapteruridae
Catfish of Africa
Freshwater fish of West Africa
Fish of Ethiopia
Fish described in 1987
Strongly electric fish